Ilya Sergeyevich Safronov (born 26 August 1998) is a Russian football player. He plays for FC Rotor Volgograd.

Club career
He made his debut in the Russian Professional Football League for FC Sibir-2 Novosibirsk on 7 August 2018 in a game against FC Sakhalin Yuzhno-Sakhalinsk.

He made his Russian Football National League debut for FC Sibir Novosibirsk on 3 March 2019 in a game against FC Tyumen.

References

External links
 
 Profile by Russian National Football League

1998 births
Living people
Russian footballers
Association football midfielders
Association football forwards
FC Sibir Novosibirsk players
FC Olimp-Dolgoprudny players
FC Rotor Volgograd players